This is the American Expeditionary Forces on the Western Front order of battle. The American Expeditionary Forces (AEF) consisted of the United States Armed Forces (mostly the United States Army) that were sent to Europe in World War I to support the Allied cause against the Central Powers. During the United States campaigns in World War I the AEF fought in France alongside French and British allied forces in the last year of the war, against Imperial German forces. Some of the troops fought alongside Italian forces in that same year, against Austro-Hungarian forces. Late in the war American units also fought in Siberia and North Russia.

President Woodrow Wilson created the AEF in May 1917, originally appointing Major General John J. Pershing, who was later promoted to general, as commander. Barely any American troops were sent to Europe in 1917, since Pershing ordered all AEF forces to be well-trained before going overseas.

The troop ships used to transport the AEF were, at first, any ships that were available. Cruisers, German ships seized by the Navy, ships borrowed from the Allies, and many other ships were used to ship troops to Europe from ports in New York, New Jersey, and Virginia. By June 1917, only 14,000 soldiers had made it to the front lines, but by May 1918 over two million American troops had reached Europe, with around half of them on the front lines.

The AEF helped the French Army on the Western Front during the Aisne Offensive (at Château-Thierry and Belleau Wood) in June 1918, and fought its major actions in the Saint-Mihiel and Meuse–Argonne Offensives in late 1918. Organized into two field armies (a third was forming as the war ended), it had a total strength of about two million men in Europe by the time of the Armistice. Planned to eventually consist of nine corps, a total of five AEF corps and two unassigned divisions were in the field by September 1918. It was subsequently involved in the Occupation of the Rhineland.

First Army 
The First Army was officially organized and activated by General John J. Pershing on 4 July 1918, although it was technically formed when the United States entered the World War in 1917. It served in the Saint-Mihiel offensive, Lorraine offensive, Champagne offensive, and the Meuse–Argonne Offensive. It was finally demobilized and moved back to the United States on 30 April 1919.

Second Army 
The Second Army was activated on 9 September and was organized by Colonel Stuart Heintzelman. On 12 October 1918, General Robert Lee Bullard took command of the Second Army and Heintzelman became his chief-of-staff. The formation was committed to the Lorraine offensive on 26 October. It attacked in the Lorraine area, and also around Saint-Mihiel, before later recapturing and liberating the Duchy of Luxemburg. It was demobilized on 15 April 1919, after the war had ended.

Third Army 
Following the defeat of Germany, Allied forces occupied the Rhineland under the terms of the Armistice.  The United States provided around 240,000 men in nine veteran divisions, nearly a third of the total occupying force, for this task. These troops were organized into the Third Army, which was established by Pershing specifically for the purpose, under the command of Major General Joseph Dickman.

I Corps 

Lieutenant General Hunter Liggett took command of I Corps when it was created, almost one year after the Americans entered the war. It served through most of the battles that the American Expeditionary Forces fought on the Western Front.

Assisted by the French XXXII Corps, I Corps was organized and activated on 15–20 January 1918. I Corps saw its first major action at the Battle of Chateau-Thierry, while seeing its first offensive action several days later at the Second Battle of the Marne. After serving briefly in the defensive sectors of Lorraine and Champagne, I Corps later served in the Battle of Saint-Mihiel and the Meuse–Argonne Offensive. It was finally demobilized on 25 March 1919.

II Corps 
II Corps was organized in January 1918 with its headquarters being located in Montreuil, France. It moved to the Western Front in February 1918, and served in the Second Battle of the Somme and the Third Battle of Albert. It mostly served alongside the New Zealand Division and the Australian Corps. After the Armistice, II Corps was reassigned to the Third Army's control, before being demobilized on 1 February 1919.
{|-
| valign="top"|

III Corps 

III Corps was first organized on 16 May 1918 in Mussy-Ser-Seine, France. It was the third of four newly activated corps of the American Expeditionary Forces, which at that time numbered over 1,000,000 men across 23 divisions. The corps took command of US forces training with the French Seventh Army at the same time that IV Corps took command of US forces training with the French Eighth Army.

It served during the Third Battle of the Aisne, the Aisne-Oise Offensive, the Aisne-Marne offensive, the Meuse–Argonne Offensive, and undertook a short time in the defensive sectors of Lorraine and Champagne. It then marched into Germany from 17 November 1918 to 2 July 1919. It was officially demobilized on 1 July 1919.

IV Corps 
IV Corps was first organized on 10 June 1918, during World War I as part of American Expeditionary Forces at Western Front, as Headquarters IV Army Corps, with its headquarters located in Neufchateau, France, which also was the headquarters of I Corps. Later, on 21 June, IV Corps was ordered to replace I Corps in the French VIII Corps area.

It participated in the Battle of Saint-Mihiel and in the defensive sector in Lorraine from 20 August 1918 to 11 September 1918. It moved into Germany from 17 November to 17 December 1918, before being demobilized in the Weimar Republic on 11 May 1919.

V Corps 

V Corps was organized over the period 7–12 July 1918 in France as a Regular Army formation within the American Expeditionary Forces. By the end of World War I, the corps had fought in three named campaigns: the Battle of Saint-Mihiel, the Meuse–Argonne Offensive, and the Lorraine Campaign.

Activated and organized by Lieutenant General William M. Wright under orders by Pershing, its headquarters was formed in Remiremont, France. It was assigned to the First Army when it was created on 15 August 1918. It held command of the French 15th Colonial Infantry Division for a short period of time in 1918. It was later demobilized on 2 May 1919 in Camp Funston, Kansas.

VI Corps 
VI Corps was activated and organized by Omar Bundy on 26 July 1918. Charles C. Ballou, Charles T. Menoher, and George Bell Jr. all assumed command at some time before the armistice. VI Corps served with the First United States Army in the Battle of Saint-Mihiel and the Meuse–Argonne Offensive. VI Corps was then stationed in Belgium and Luxemburg from 19 December 1918 to 11 April 1919, when it was finally demobilized.

VII Corps 
On 16 August 1918, Major General William M. Wright was designated as VII Corps' temporary commander. Three days later, the formation was designated an administrative organization and tasked with commanding training efforts in the French XXXIII Corps and the French XL Corps areas, relieving V Corps of the command. It saw no combat action in World War I. It marched into Germany from 22 November to 12 December 1918. It was finally demobilized on 11 May 1919, with its remnants becoming part of the Third Army.

VIII Corps 
Activated and organized by Major General Henry T. Allen on 18 November 1918, VIII Corps was ordered to train and supervise troops of the First Army that were withdrawing from the Meuse-Argonne theater to American training areas in France. It saw no combat during World War I, as it was formed after the Armistice. It was demobilized on 20 April 1919.

IX Corps 
IX Corps was organized and activated by Brigadier General William K. Naylor on 16 November 1918, although Major General Adelbert Cronkhite assumed command on 18 November, after which Naylor became his chief-of-staff. It constituted the left flank of the Second Army on the front between Jonville and Fresnes-en-Woevre. It supervised the activities of formations (such as police duties), due to the armistice, when it was in the area. It was finally demobilized on 5 May 1919.

Unassigned divisions 
These divisions were unassigned to any corps in the AEF during World War I at the time of the Armistice.

See also 
 American Expeditionary Force Siberia
 American Expeditionary Force North Russia

References

Notes

Citations

Bibliography

Web sources 
 
 
 
 
 
 

Army units and formations of the United States in World War I
World War I orders of battle